Erich Herman Federschmidt (June 14, 1895 – February 24, 1962) was an American rower who competed in the 1920 Summer Olympics. He died in Martin County, Florida. In 1920 he was part of the American boat, which won the silver medal in the coxed fours event.

References

External links
 Erich Federschmidt's profile at databaseOlympics
 Erich Federschmidt's profile at Sports Reference.com

1895 births
1962 deaths
Rowers at the 1920 Summer Olympics
Olympic silver medalists for the United States in rowing
American male rowers
Medalists at the 1920 Summer Olympics